Miche Wabun Lake is located in Glacier National Park, in the U. S. state of Montana. Runoff from the Miche Wabun Glacier and other icefields feed the lake after cascading over Miche Wabun Falls. Miche Wabun Lake is at the head of the North Fork Belly River and is surrounded by Kaina Mountain to the east, Miche Wabun Peak to the north and Goat Haunt Mountain to the southwest.

See also
List of lakes in Glacier County, Montana

References

Lakes of Glacier National Park (U.S.)
Lakes of Glacier County, Montana